Carl Ebenezer Waite (February 2, 1902 – October 14, 1961) was an American professional football player who spent three seasons in the National Football League with the Frankford Yellow Jackets in 1928, the Orange Tornadoes in 1929, and the Newark Tornadoes in 1930. Waite appeared in 27 games, making 15 starts.

References

1902 births
1961 deaths
Rutgers University alumni
Players of American football from New York (state)
Frankford Yellow Jackets players
Orange Tornadoes players
Newark Tornadoes players